James Morris Newill (August 12, 1911 – July 31, 1975), sometimes credited as Jim Newill, was an American actor and singer.

Early life 
Newill was born in Pittsburgh, Pennsylvania, to Mayme Newill and her first husband. His parents divorced, and his mother married John W. Newill, who adopted him. Newill had three siblings, Evelyn, Clyde, and Calvin. In 1930, his family moved to Los Angeles Country, California. He studied music at the University of California.

Career 
Newill began to sing in the early 1930s with the Mann Brothers, a west coast band whose home base was Spokane, Washington. In 1932, he was vocalizing with the Phil Harris band at the Cocoanut Grove night club at the Ambassador Hotel in Los Angeles. In the beginning of 1933, he toured and sang with the Gus Arnheim orchestra, and that included more performances at the Cocoanut Grove. He was still performing with the Arnheim band in the late 1934.

He recorded with the Eddy Duchin Orchestra in 1936, recording "Night in Manhattan" (Victor 25390-B); "I'll Sing You a Thousand Love Songs" (Victor 25393-B); and "You're Still Mine In My Dreams" (Victor 25395-B)).

During the latter half of 1936, he was the singer on the George Burns and Gracie Allen radio show on CBS. By late 1936, Newill had moved on and the new singer for George and Gracie was Tony Marvin.

His film career began in 1937 with an uncredited singing role in The Affair of Susan. From 1937 to 1940, Jim played Sergeant Renfrew of the Royal Mounted in five Royal Mountie films. 

Newill was known mostly for his western roles, having been one-third of the Texas Rangers in the Texas Rangers series of B-movies. Of the 22-film series, Newill co-starred in the first 14, along with co-stars Dave O'Brien and Guy Wilkerson. He played Texas Ranger Jim Steele. In some of his westerns, he's also credited with co-writing some of the film songs.

His last film was 1944's Gunsmoke Mesa.

With his somewhat operatic voice, he sang with the Los Angeles Civic Light Opera. In 1944 he made his Broadway debut as
Sergeant Tim O'Hara in Vernon Duke's Sadie Thompson with June Havoc in the title role. He also portrayed Yellow Foot, Pawnee's Messenger (replacing original cast member Walter John) in the original Broadway run of Irving Berlin's Annie Get Your Gun in 1947-1948.

Death 
Newill died on July 31, 1975, from cancer.

Discography 
 The Lord Is My Shepherd (1953)

Filmography 

 The Affair of Susan (1935) - Singer (uncredited)
 Sing While You're Able (1937) - Radio Singer
 Renfrew of the Royal Mounted (1937) - Sergeant Renfrew
 Something to Sing About (1937) - Jimmy - Band Member
 On the Great White Trail (1938) - Sergeant Renfrew
 Fighting Mad (1939) - Sergeant Renfrew
 Crashing Thru (1939) - Sgt. Renfrew
 Yukon Flight (1940) - Sgt. Renfrew
 Danger Ahead (1940) - Sgt. Renfrew
 Murder on the Yukon (1940) - Sgt. Renfrew
 Sky Bandits (1940) - Sgt. Renfrew
 The Great American Broadcast (1941) - Singer
 The Falcon's Brother (1942) - Paul Harrington
 The Rangers Take Over (1942) - Texas Ranger Jim Steele
 Bad Men of Thunder Gap (1943) - Texas Ranger Jim Steele
 West of Texas (1943) - Texas Ranger Jim Steele
 Bombardier (1943) - Capt. Rand
 Border Buckaroos (1943) - Texas Ranger Jim Steele
 Fighting Valley (1943) - Texas Ranger Jim Steele
 Trail of Terror (1943) - Texas Ranger Jim Steele
 The Return of the Rangers (1943) - Texas Ranger Jim Steele
 Boss of Rawhide (1943) - Texas Ranger Jim Steele
 Outlaw Roundup (1944) - Texas Ranger Jim Steele
 Guns of the Law (1944) - Texas Ranger Jim Steele
 The Pinto Bandit (1944) - Texas Ranger Jim Steele
 Spook Town (1944) - Texas Ranger Jim Steele
 Brand of the Devil (1944) - Jim Steele
 Gunsmoke Mesa (1944) - Texas Ranger Jim Steele (final film role)

References

External links

1911 births
1975 deaths
Male actors from Pittsburgh
American male film actors
American male musical theatre actors
20th-century American singers
20th-century American male actors
20th-century American male singers